Getishen is a village in the Kajaran Municipality of the Syunik Province in Armenia.

Toponymy 
The village is also known as Getashen, and was also previously known as Chaykend.

Demographics

Population 
The village had a population of 96 at the 2001 census.

References 

Populated places in Syunik Province